Abdullah Al-Noubi (Arabic:عبد الله النوبي; born 8 January 1987) is an Emirati footballer who plays as a winger or full back.

External links

References

1987 births
Living people
Emirati footballers
People from Abu Dhabi
Association football utility players
Al Wahda FC players
Al Dhafra FC players
Baniyas Club players
UAE Pro League players
UAE First Division League players
United Arab Emirates international footballers
Footballers at the 2006 Asian Games
Asian Games competitors for the United Arab Emirates